Kianoush Rostami (born 23 July 1991) is an Iranian Kurdish Olympian weightlifter. He competed at the 2016 Summer Olympics, in the 85 kg event, winning the gold medal and setting a new world record with a total lift of 396 kilograms.

Rostami won the silver medal at the London 2012 Summer Olympics. He originally took home the bronze medal, which ascended to a silver medal when Apti Aukhadov tested positive for dehydrochloromethyltestosterone from samples taken in 2012.

Despite having the third highest total at 96kg in Olympic qualifying, Rostami failed to qualify for the Tokyo Olympic Games, as he sat 31st in the ROBI point rankings because he scored zero points in the second qualification period (1 May 2019 to 31 October 2019) of the 2020 Olympics after missing all three lifts in the snatch portion of the 2019 World Weightlifting Championships.

Career
Rostami won the gold medal in the Men's 85 kg weight class at the 2011 World Weightlifting Championships.

Rostami won the silver medal at the 2012 Summer Olympics in the men's 85 kg event with a total of 380 kg. In June 2016, it was announced his silver medal ascendancy after Apti Aukhadov had tested positive for prohibited substances and therefore disqualified for a medal.

In 2016, while competing at the Fajr Cup, in Tehran, Iran, Kianoush broke the Clean and jerk world record for his weight division, lifting 220 kg. Kianoush also broke the world record for his total, with 395 kg. 

Kianoush Rostami competed in the 2016 Rio Olympics, representing Iran in the 85 kg weight division. He won the gold medal in the 85 kg weight class at the 2016 Summer Olympics by tying an Olympic record with a 217 kg clean and jerk – set by Tian Tao just minutes prior –  and setting a world record total with 396 kg.

Major results

References

External links

Facebook page

1991 births
Living people
Iranian Kurdish people
Iranian male weightlifters
Iranian strength athletes
People from Eslamabad-e Gharb
Olympic weightlifters of Iran
Weightlifters at the 2012 Summer Olympics
Weightlifters at the 2016 Summer Olympics
Olympic gold medalists for Iran
Olympic silver medalists for Iran
Olympic medalists in weightlifting
Medalists at the 2012 Summer Olympics
Medalists at the 2016 Summer Olympics
Kurdish sportspeople
Iranian Yarsanis
Weightlifters at the 2010 Asian Games
Weightlifters at the 2014 Asian Games
Asian Games medalists in weightlifting
Asian Games silver medalists for Iran
World Weightlifting Championships medalists
Medalists at the 2014 Asian Games
Weightlifters at the 2018 Asian Games